Aleksei Sergeyevich Bondarev (born 5 August 1987) is a former Russian footballer.

External links

1987 births
Sportspeople from Volgograd
Living people
Russian footballers
Association football defenders
FC Khimik-Arsenal players
FC Politehnica Chișinău players
FC Dacia Chișinău players
Moldovan Super Liga players
Russian expatriate footballers
Expatriate footballers in Moldova
Russian expatriate sportspeople in Moldova